Isak Steiner Jensen (born 23 December 2003) is a Danish professional footballer who plays for American MLS side St. Louis City as a left winger.

Career

SønderjyskE
Jensen played for Næsby and OB before he joined SønderjyskE.

Jensen was already training continuously with the first-team squad at age 16 and on 20 November 2020, he signed a three-year contract with the club. 17-year old Jensen got his official debut for SønderjyskE against Fremad Amager in a Danish Cup game. This was his only appearance in the 2020-21 season.

In the 2021-22 season, he got his debut in the Danish Superliga age 17 in a match against Randers FC on 8 August 2021.

St. Louis City
On 11 July 2022 it was confirmed, that Jensen had been sold to American MLS side St. Louis City, who would begin play in the 2023 season, with the player signing a deal until the end of 2026, with an option for one further year. He would join the second team for the 2022 season.

References

External links

2003 births
Living people
Danish men's footballers
Danish expatriate men's footballers
Association football wingers
Denmark youth international footballers
Danish Superliga players
SønderjyskE Fodbold players
Danish expatriate sportspeople in the United States
Expatriate soccer players in the United States
MLS Next Pro players